Donald Howard may refer to:

 Donald Howard, 3rd Baron Strathcona and Mount Royal (1891–1959), British politician 
 Donald Howard (priest) (1927–2007), Anglican priest
 Donald L. Howard, American jockey
 Donald R. Howard (Donald Roy Howard), American academic and author
 Donald Ray Howard (1933–2013), American educator and author